The 1981 Sabah state election was held between Monday, 23 March and Saturday, 28 March 1981. This was the fourth state election to take place. The Sabah State Legislative Assembly was dissolved on 21 February 1981, 2 months earlier than the expiry of the Assembly term on 26 April 1981. Candidates nomination took place on 7 April 1981.

In the election, BERJAYA Party led by Harris Salleh, an ally of federal government party Barisan Nasional (BN), won the election with a supermajority of 44 seats out of 48, and thus continued its governance of the state won since the last election on 1976. USNO, another component party of BN but opposition to BERJAYA on state level, created a coalition, Barisan Sabah, with PASOK and SCCP to fight BERJAYA. However the result were disastrous to the new coalition as they only won 4 seats; USNO reduced from 20 to 3 seats, SCCP winning one seat and PASOK none.

Results

Aftermath

After USNO and Barisan Sabah's comprehensive defeat in the election, Said Keruak stepped down as USNO leader, replaced by Mustapha Harun, the former USNO leader and former Chief Minister. USNO would later expelled from BN in 1984, due to Mustapha's action against BN, one of which opposing the move to make Labuan a Federal Territory.

Internal clashes within BERJAYA led to Joseph Pairin Kitingan, the party's vice-president, exiting BERJAYA with several of the party assemblymen and formed Parti Bersatu Sabah (PBS). Pairin also won a December 1984 by-election, as an independent, in the Tambunan seat he had to vacate due to his resignation from BERJAYA and Sabah Assembly. These events led to Harris calling a snap election in March 1985, with the election held on 20–21 April 1985. PBS succeeded in toppling the BERJAYA government, winning 25 seats and setting in motion the 1985-1986 constitutional crisis in Sabah.

References

Sabah state elections
Sabah